Kuchak Kumsar (also Romanized as Kūchak Kūmsār; also known as Kūchak Komsār and Kūchek Komsār) is a village in Chubar Rural District, Ahmadsargurab District, Shaft County, Gilan Province, Iran. At the 2006 census, its population was 190, in 51 families.

References 

Populated places in Shaft County